The 1953–54 NBA season was the Hawks' fifth season in the NBA and third season in Milwaukee.

Regular season

Season standings

x – clinched playoff spot

Record vs. opponents

Game log

References

Atlanta Hawks seasons
Milwaukee
Milwaukee Hawks
Milwaukee Hawks